Phyllocnistis vitifoliella is a moth of the family Gracillariidae, known from Québec and the United States (where it has been recorded from Wisconsin, California, Florida, Georgia, Maryland, Michigan, New York, Texas, Vermont, Kentucky and Illinois).

The hostplants for the species include Vitis cordifolia and Vitis vulpina. They mine the leaves of their host plant. The mine has the form of a long, linear, winding mine on the upperside of the leaf. Pupation takes place in a pupal chamber at the distal end of the mine.

References

External links
Phyllocnistis at microleps.org
Bug Guide

Phyllocnistis